Silver laurate is an inorganic compound, a salt of silver and lauric acid with the formula , colorless (white) crystals.

Physical properties
Silver laurate forms colorless (white) crystals of triclinic crystal system, cell parameters a = 0.5517 nm, b = 3.435 nm, c = 0.4097 nm, α = 91.18°, β = 124.45°, γ = 92.90°, Z = 2.

It does not dissolve in ethanol or in diethyl ether.

References

Laurates
Silver compounds